"Bring It Back" is a song by the American rap group Travis Porter, released on February 7, 2011, as the second single from their first studio album, From Day 1 (2012). It is their second song to chart on the Billboard Hot 100, entering at #69 in the week ending April 1, 2011, and has since peaked at #75. The official remix version features fellow rapper Too Short, appears as a bonus track on the group's mixtape Music, Money, Magnums.

Background and composition
The song was produced by FKi & DJ Spinz. "Bring It Back" has a more upbeat production compared to some of Travis Porter's other songs.

Remixes
Tyga
 Too Short
Cali Swag District

Music video
The music video was released to YouTube on March 16, 2011.

Track listing
US digital single

Charts

Weekly charts

Year-end charts

Certifications

References

2011 singles
Travis Porter songs
2011 songs
Jive Records singles
Songs written by FKi 1st
Songs written by DJ Spinz